Vivian Tyrell (born 21 July 1923, date of death unknown) was a Guyanese cricketer. He played in one first-class match for British Guiana in 1945/46.

See also
 List of Guyanese representative cricketers

References

External links
 

1923 births
Year of death missing
Guyanese cricketers
Guyana cricketers
Sportspeople from Georgetown, Guyana